Ostvik is a locality situated in Skellefteå Municipality, Västerbotten County, Sweden with 387 inhabitants in 2010.

Ostvik has had a substantial amount of secret military installations for its size, everything from secret underground bunkers to different kind of radar stations. Today there is almost nothing left, but the memories still live on among the older residents.

References 

Populated places in Västerbotten County
Populated places in Skellefteå Municipality